Antsiferovskaya is a rural locality (a village) in Yavengskoye Rural Settlement, Vozhegodsky District, Vologda Oblast, Russia. The population was 39 as of 2002.

Geography 
The distance to Vozhega is 37 km, to Baza is 24 km. Olekhovskaya, Dorkovskaya, Gora, Fedyayevskaya are the nearest rural localities.

References 

Rural localities in Vozhegodsky District